Faustini is a lunar impact crater that lies near the south pole of the Moon. It is located nearly due south of the much larger crater Amundsen, and is almost attached to Shoemaker to the southwest. About one crater diameter due south is the smaller crater Shackleton at the south pole. A small crater is attached to the eastern rim of Faustini.

Due to its location, sunlight reaches the rim of this crater at a very low angle, leaving the interior in permanent darkness. As a result, the crater floor has never been observed by orbiting spacecraft, although it has been roughly mapped by radar. The lack of illumination by the Sun, the interior remains at a permanent temperature below 100 kelvins, cold enough to trap any water vapor that reaches the crater following comet impacts on the Moon.

The Lunar Prospector spacecraft carried a neutron spectrometer that could be used to detect the presence of large concentrations of hydrogen. The cold trap within Faustini was identified as having a high concentration of hydrogen, relative to the norm for the lunar surface. However, radar observations of this crater failed to detect ice.

References 

 

 
 
 
 
 
 
 
 
 
 
 
 

LQ30 quadrangle
Impact craters on the Moon